Río Blanco National Reserve is a national reserve of Chile,  northeast of Santiago.

References

National reserves of Chile
Protected areas of Valparaíso Region